In enzymology, a phosphatidylcholine synthase is an enzyme that catalyzes the chemical reaction

CDP-diacylglycerol + choline  CMP + phosphatidylcholine

Thus, the two substrates of this enzyme are CDP-diacylglycerol and choline, whereas its two products are CMP and phosphatidylcholine.

This enzyme belongs to the family of transferases, specifically those transferring non-standard substituted phosphate groups.  The systematic name of this enzyme class is CDP-diacylglycerol:choline O-phosphatidyltransferase. This enzyme is also called CDP-diglyceride-choline O-phosphatidyltransferase.  This enzyme participates in glycerophospholipid metabolism.

References

 
 

EC 2.7.8
Enzymes of unknown structure